Rossari Biotech is an Indian chemical manufacturing company with a focus on specialty chemicals. It is also engaged in production of specialty enzymes and chemicals in India that is used in the pharmaceuticals, paper, construction, textiles, nutrition and animal health industries. The company was started in 2003 as a partnership firm titled Rossari Labtech and was incorporated into a company in 2009 and was renamed as Rossari Biotech.

It has two R&D facilities, one at Silvassa manufacturing facility and the second in Dahej.

Awards
BIRAC Best Innovator award (2014)
Bio Excellence award from Government of Karnataka (2011)

References

Indian companies established in 2009
Chemical companies established in 2009
Chemical companies of India
Companies listed on the National Stock Exchange of India
Companies listed on the Bombay Stock Exchange